Achyra llaguenalis is a moth in the family Crambidae. It was described by Eugene G. Munroe in 1978. It is found in Peru.

References

Moths described in 1978
Pyraustinae
Moths of South America